There was a nominal total of 96 quota places available (in parasport events only) for athletics at the 2022 Commonwealth Games; 48 each for men and women.

Rules
Each Commonwealth Games Association (CGA) may qualify up to three places per event, which equates to a maximum quota of thirty-six. Seven places per event are determined by the World Para Athletics (WPA) World Rankings (for performances between 31 December 2020 and 25 April 2022), with the last spot reserved for a Bipartite Invitation; all those who qualify may also enter other events provided the three-per-CGA limit is respected.

The events are open to sport classes as follows:
Men's 100 metres T12: T11/12
Men's 100 metres T38: T37/38
Men's 100 metres T47: T45–47
Men's 1500 metres T54: T53/54
Men's marathon T54: T53/54
Men's discus throw F44/64: F42–44/61–64
Women's 100 metres T34: T33/34
Women's 100 metres T38: T37/38
Women's 1500 metres T54: T53/54
Women's marathon T54: T53/54
Women's shot put F57: F55–57
Women's discus throw F44/64: F42–44/61–64

In addition, all those who qualify for the men's 100 metres T12 event are entitled to compete with a guide, which has no impact on quota allocation.

Timeline

Men's events

100 metres T12

100 metres T38

100 metres T47

1500 metres T54

Marathon T54

Discus throw F44/64

Women's events

100 metres T34

100 metres T38

1500 metres T54

Marathon T54

Shot put F57

Discus throw F44/64

References

2020 in athletics (track and field)
2021 in athletics (track and field)
2022 in athletics (track and field)
Athletics at the 2022 Commonwealth Games
Qualification for the 2022 Commonwealth Games